Jemma Gawned (born 22 December 1974 in Perth, Australia), She became well known as a contestant on Big Brother Australia 2001.

Career 
Gawned was known as the "lip gloss queen" whilst in the Big Brother House and used this and her background as a make up artist to pursue a business in cosmetics. As creator and director of Jemma Cosmetics, she saw the business grow from a range of lip glosses to an entire cosmetic range. After Big Brother, Gawned hosted Australia's Search for a Supermodel, and followed on to be a regular on Bert Newton's GMA. In 2008, Gawned made a guest appearance on an episode of Australian drama City Homicide as Melanie Steadman, the victim of a murder.

In 2011, Jemma Gosmetics line was on the verge of retailing in major department stores when an investor pulled out and Gawned was forced to put the company into administration. She now runs a successful raw food company, Naked Treaties, based in Byron Bay.

Personal life
Throughout 2005 and 2006, Gawned dated Australian television star Daniel MacPherson. She is also a patron for the Australian charity Kids Help Line.

References

1974 births
Living people
Big Brother (Australian TV series) contestants